Al-Muhājir ibn Khālid ibn al-Walīd (died 657) was an Arab soldier in the army of Caliph Ali and son of the prominent general Khalid ibn al-Walid. He died in the Battle of Siffin.

Muhajir was a son of Khalid ibn al-Walid, a member of the Banu Makhzum and a leading general of the early Muslim conquests. Unlike his paternal brother Abd al-Rahman, Muhajir supported Caliph Ali in the First Muslim Civil War and died fighting against the army of Ali's principal enemy, the governor of Syria and future founder of the Umayyad Caliphate Mu'awiya ibn Abi Sufyan, at the Battle of Siffin in the summer of 657. After Abd al-Rahman was alleged to have been poisoned to death on Mu'awiya's orders in 666/67, Muhajir's son Khalid from Mecca killed his uncle's alleged poisoner Ibn Uthal in Syria, was arrested and released after paying blood money. Khalid ibn Muhajir was also a poet and sided with Abd Allah ibn al-Zubayr, a rival claimant to the caliphate, against the Umayyads during the Second Muslim Civil War.

References

Bibliography

657 deaths
Banu Makhzum
People of the First Fitna
7th-century Arabs